Carlos Saavedra Lamas (November 1, 1878 – May 5, 1959) was an Argentine academic and politician, and in 1936, the first Latin American Nobel Peace Prize recipient.

Biography
Born in Buenos Aires, Saavedra Lamas was a descendant of an early Argentine patriot. He married the daughter of president Roque Sáenz Peña. Saavedra Lamas achieved renown not only as foreign minister of Argentina for his practical work in drafting international agreements and in conducting international mediation, but also as a professor for his scholarship in the fields of labor legislation and international law.

Saavedra Lamas was a distinguished student at Lacordaire College and at the University of Buenos Aires Faculty of Law, where he received the Doctor of Laws degree in 1903, summa cum laude. After study in Paris and travel abroad, he accepted a professorship in law and constitutional history at the University of La Plata, where he began the teaching career that was to span more than forty years. Later, he inaugurated a course in sociology at the University of Buenos Aires, taught political economy and constitutional law in the Law School of the university, and eventually served as the rector of the university.

Saavedra Lamas was a leading Argentine academician in two areas. A pioneer in the field of labor legislation, he edited several treatises on labor legislation in Argentina and on the need for a universally recognized doctrine on the treatment of labor - among them, Centro de legislacíon social y del trabajo (1927) Center of Social and Labor Legislation, Traités internationaux de type social (1924), Código nacional del trabajo (three volumes, 1933) [National Code of Labor Law]. In the arena of practical affairs, Saavedra Lamas drafted legislation affecting labor in Argentina, supported the founding of the International Labor Organization in 1919, and presided over the ILO Conference of 1928 in Geneva while serving simultaneously as leader of the Argentine delegation.

In international law, his other field of major scholarly interest, he published "La Crise de la codification et de la doctrine Argentine de droit international" (1931); and he spoke, wrote, or drafted legislation on many subjects with international ramifications - among them, asylum, colonization, immigration, arbitration, and international peace. His brief Vida internacional, which he wrote at the age of seventy, is an urbane by-product of all this study and experience.

Saavedra Lamas began his political career in 1906 as director of Public Credit and then became the secretary-general for the municipality of Buenos Aires in 1907. In 1908 he was elected to the first of two successive terms in Parliament. There he initiated legislation regarding coastal water rights, irrigation, sugar production, government finances, colonization, and immigration. His main interest, however, lay in foreign affairs. He provided leadership in saving Argentina's arbitration treaty with Italy, which almost foundered in 1907–1908, and eventually became the unofficial adviser to both the legislature and the foreign office on the analysis and implications of proposed foreign treaties. Saavedra Lamas though was also a controversial public figure as he was seen by the masses as an elitist patrician who was too conservative and favored British intervention, especially in railroad construction.

Appointed minister of Justice and Education in 1915, he instituted educational reforms by integrating the different divisions of public education and by developing a curriculum at the intermediate level for the vocational and technical training of manpower needed in a developing industrial country.

When General Agustín P. Justo became president of Argentina in 1932, he appointed Saavedra Lamas as foreign minister. In this post for six years, Saavedra Lamas brought international prestige to Argentina. He played an important role in every South American diplomatic issue of the middle thirties, induced Argentina to rejoin the League of Nations after an absence of thirteen years, and represented Argentina at virtually every international meeting of consequence during this period.

His work in ending the Chaco War between Paraguay and Bolivia (1932–1935) had not only local significance but generalized international importance as well. When he took over the foreign office, he immediately engaged in a series of moves to lay the diplomatic groundwork for a negotiated settlement of this dispute. In 1932 he initiated at Washington the Declaration of August 3 which put the American states on record as refusing to recognize any territorial change in the hemisphere brought about by force. Next, he drew up a Treaty of Nonaggression and Conciliation which was signed by six South American countries in October, 1933, and by all of the American countries at the Seventh Pan-American Conference at Montevideo two months later. In 1935 he organized mediation by six neutral American nations which resulted in the cessation of hostilities between Paraguay and Bolivia. Meanwhile, in 1934, Saavedra Lamas presented the South American Antiwar Pact to the League of Nations where it was well received and signed by eleven countries. Acclaimed for all of these efforts, he was elected president of the Assembly of the League of Nations in 1936.

After his retirement from the foreign ministry in 1938, Saavedra Lamas returned to academic life, became president of the University of Buenos Aires for two years (1941–1943), and rounded out his career as a professor for an additional three years (1943–1946).

Saavedra Lamas was known as a strict disciplinarian in his office, a logician at the conference table, a charming host in his home or his art gallery, and a man of sartorial elegance who wore, it is said, the highest collars in Buenos Aires. In addition to the Nobel Peace Prize, he was awarded the Grand Cross of the Legion of Honor of France and analogous honors from ten other countries.

He died in 1959 at the age of eighty from the effects of a brain hemorrhage.

In March 2014 his solid gold Nobel medal was put up for auction after being found in a South American pawn shop.

In August 2014 a project for rebuying his Nobel medal by the Argentine Nation was presented at the Argentine congress. His auctioned medal was later won and is now owned by a private Asian collector.

Notes

References

External links

 

1878 births
1959 deaths
People from Buenos Aires
Argentine people of Galician descent
National Autonomist Party politicians
Members of the Argentine Chamber of Deputies elected in Buenos Aires
Members of the Argentine Chamber of Deputies elected in Buenos Aires Province
Foreign ministers of Argentina
People of the Infamous Decade
University of Buenos Aires alumni
National University of La Plata alumni
Rectors of the University of Buenos Aires
Argentine Nobel laureates
Nobel Peace Prize laureates
Burials at La Recoleta Cemetery
Argentine ministers of education
Grand Crosses of the Order of the White Lion